Carolyn Whitney Carter (born January 12, 1990) is a Virgin Islander actress, model and beauty pageant titleholder who won Miss US Virgin Islands 2016. She represented the U.S. Virgin Islands at the Miss Universe 2016.

Personal life
Carter was born in New Orleans and grew up in St Croix. She graduated from AZ Academy in St. Croix and swam competitively for the St. Croix Dolphins for 11 years and the US Virgin Islands National Swim Team. She attended Emory University in Atlanta, Georgia, where she studied art and art history.

Pageantry

Miss World US Virgin Islands 2010
Carter was crowned Miss World U.S. Virgin Islands 2010 and then competed at Miss World 2010 in China.

Miss World 2010
Carter represented the island at Miss World 2010 in China but did not placed.

Miss Supranational 2011
Carter also represented the island at Miss Supranational 2011 in Poland but did not place.

Miss Earth 2012
Carter competed at Miss Earth 2012 on November 24, 2012.

Miss US Virgin Islands 2016
Carter was crowned Miss US Virgin Islands Universe on May 2, 2016, in St. Thomas, US Virgin Islands.

Miss Universe 2016
Carter represented the island in Miss Universe 2016 but did not place.

References

External links
 missusvirginislands2016.com
 Instagram

1990 births
Living people
Miss Earth 2012 contestants
Miss Universe 2016 contestants
Miss World 2010 delegates